The 2019 NAB League Girls season was the third season of the NAB League Girls competition for under-18 female Australian rules footballers in Victoria. The season commenced on 3 March and concluded on 25 May. The premiership was won by the Northern Knights, who defeated the Calder Cannons in the Grand Final. A total of 13 teams competed this season, one more than the previous season owing to the inclusion of a team from Tasmania, however they played only two matches and so we were automatically last-place finishers.

Ladder

Finals series

Semi-finals

Grand Final

References

NAB League
NAB League Girls
Nab League Girls